Ted Evetts (born 3 August 1997) is an English darts player who competes in Professional Darts Corporation (PDC) events. He is the 2021 PDC World Youth Champion.

Career
Evetts plays for his local Super League team and also plays Men's County for Warwickshire as well as being signed on to Warwickshire Youth County.  He is also a qualified chef.

After competing on the PDC Development Tour in 2014 and 2015, Evetts gained a PDC Pro Tour card on the second day of the 2016 Qualifying School.

Evetts was a qualifier for the 2016 Grand Slam of Darts, which was his first televised event. He lost all of three of his group games.

Evetts went on to hit the first 9 darter on the PDC Pro Tour of 2017. In 2017 he qualified for the 2018 PDC World Darts Championship, losing in the first round to Gerwyn Price.

Evetts reached his first senior quarter-final at The 2019 German Darts Grand Prix. He beat Mark Wilson, Jonny Clayton and Ricky Evans before losing to eventual winner Michael van Gerwen 6-5.

On 17 December 2019, Evetts lost to Fallon Sherrock at the PDC World Championships in the first round. This was the first time a woman won at the World Championships, and Evetts was praised by the presenting team and on social media for his gracious reaction.

World Championship results

PDC
 2018: First round (lost to Gerwyn Price 0–3)
 2019: Second round (lost to Adrian Lewis 0–3)
 2020: First round (lost to Fallon Sherrock 2–3)
 2022: First round (lost to Jim Williams 1–3)

Performance timeline

PDC European Tour

References

External links

1997 births
Living people
English darts players
People from Warwickshire
Professional Darts Corporation current tour card holders
PDC world youth champions

INSTAGRAM

FACEBOOK